Denver is an unincorporated community located in southern Huntington Township, Ross County, Ohio, United States. It is in the south of the county, near the boundary with Pike County.

The FIPS place code is 21756. The elevation is 836 feet above sea level.

History
The community's name is a transfer from Denver, Colorado. A post office called Denver was established in 1882, and remained in operation until 1935. Besides the post office, Denver had a country store.

References 

Unincorporated communities in Ross County, Ohio
Unincorporated communities in Ohio
1882 establishments in Ohio
Populated places established in 1882